Paul Masotti (born March 10, 1965) is a former professional Canadian football player and current front office executive with the Canadian Football League Toronto Argonauts. Masotti played the wide receiver position for 12 seasons with the Toronto Argonauts, from 1988 to 1999, retiring just before the 2000 season to join the Argos front office first as Executive Vice-President, and then as general manager.

College football career 
Born in Hamilton, Ontario, Masotti played for the Axemen of Acadia University and was named an AUAA All-Star in 1985 and 1987.

Professional football career 
Masotti was the Toronto Argonauts first pick and 15th overall in the 1988 CFL Canadian College Draft.  Masotti, however, first signed as a free agent with the Washington Redskins of the National Football League and was one of the Redskins' final cuts.  Masotti made his professional debut with the Argos on September 25, 1988.

Over his 12 seasons, all with the Argonauts, Masotti amassed four straight 1,000-yard seasons from 1994–1997, caught 556 passes for 8,772 yards (a club record for Canadian receivers; current club record holder is former teammate Derrell "Mookie" Mitchell) and 44 touchdowns, and won three Grey Cup rings.

In the 1997 Grey Cup Masotti was named the Most Valuable Canadian Player leading the team with six receptions for 102 yards.  Argos quarterback Doug Flutie, who won a new Chrysler truck as the Grey Cup Most Valuable Player, gave Masotti the prize in recognition of his accomplishments.

Following his retirement as an active player in 2000, a banner with Masotti's name and photograph was added to the list of All-Time Argonauts hanging from the rafters of the Rogers Centre. He is now working for Hillfield Strathallan College as Athletic Director.

Masotti is a first cousin of Mike Morreale, a former wide receiver in the CFL with the Argonauts & the Hamilton Tiger-Cats.

CFL GM record

References

1965 births
Acadia Axemen football players
Canadian football wide receivers
Canadian people of Italian descent
Living people
Players of Canadian football from Ontario
Sportspeople from Hamilton, Ontario
Toronto Argonauts general managers
Toronto Argonauts players